Max Simon (6 January 1899 – 1 February 1961) was a German SS commander and war criminal during World War II. Simon was one of the first members of the SS in the early 1930s. He rose through the ranks of the SS, and became a corps commander during World War II. After the war, Simon was convicted for his role in the Marzabotto massacre and the Sant'Anna di Stazzema massacre.

Early career

Simon was born in Breslau. In 1917 he joined the army and served in  the 11th Division. He served in Macedonia and on the Western Front, being awarded the Iron Cross 2nd class. At the end of the war he joined the Freikorps in Silesia and fought against the Polish forces. His unit was later incorporated into the Reichswehr as the 16th Cavalry Regiment and Simon was promoted to Unterfeldwebel.

In May 1933 he joined the SS and the Nazi Party, and was assigned to the 47th SS-Standarte in Gera and was promoted to Untersturmführer (Second Lieutenant) in November 1934, until ordered to raise a new unit in 1935, 1st SS Totenkopfstandarte Oberbayern and given the rank of Standartenführer (Colonel). In 1934 he was appointed as the commander of the Sachsenburg concentration camp. In 1938 he took part in the Anschluss of Austria, the occupation of Bohemia and Moravia and the occupation of the Sudetenland.

World War II

At the start of World War II, the SS Regiment was renamed in October 1939. During the Battle of France, Simon led his regiment in the capture of Pixie, Lyon, Orléans, Tours and Bordeaux and then advanced to the border with Spain.

In July 1941, Simon took part in the invasion of Soviet Union, Operation Barbarossa, as part of Army Group North, taking Kraslava and breaking through the Stalin Line, where Simon was wounded. For the fighting in the Battles of the Demyansk Pocket, Simon was awarded the Knight's Cross and promoted to Oberführer (Senior Colonel). In December 1942 Simon was promoted again to Brigadeführer (Brigadier General), prior to being given command of the SS Division Reichsführer-SS.

The SS Division Reichsführer-SS was to be formed in Hungary from Simon's old regiment and the Sturmbrigade Reichsführer SS. In 1944, the division was moved to Italy, and fought, never complete, at Anzio and later in the Arno sector, where it gained a reputation for stability although it suffered heavy losses during the battles in the Apennines. The division also fought against partisans behind the lines, perpetrating several major atrocities against civilians (Sant'Anna di Stazzema massacre and Marzabotto massacre), for which Simon was awarded the Oakleaves for the Knight's Cross and the German Cross in Gold, in October 1944.

In November 1944, Simon was promoted and was given command of the XIII SS Corps. The XIII SS Corps deployed to the Lorraine region against the United States Army, and from December 1944 defended the Siegfried Line.

The XIII SS Army Corps retreated into the Saarland and the Palatinate where it started to destroy the Rhine bridges. In April 1945 between Main and Jagst it came up against the 4th US Armored Division and took part in heavy fighting around the Tauber – Colombia line and around Würzburg and Nuremberg. The Corps then fought a withdrawal to the Danube and around Munich. On the orders of Simon the bridges over the Isar approaching Austria were not blown up, as he believed there was no need as the end of the war was near.

Killings in Brettheim

Brettheim is a village in the Schwäbisch Hall district of Baden-Württemberg. Simon ordered the execution of Friedrich Hanselmann, Leonhard Gackstatter and Leonhard Wolfmeyer for Wehrkraftzersetzung ("undermining military morale") on 10 April 1945. The farmer Hanselmann had taken away the weapons of 15-year-old boys from the Hitler Youth and had thrown them into the local pond. The boys reported this to their commanding officer SS-Sturmbannführer Gottschalk, who had Hanselmann arrested. Gottschalk sentenced Hanselmann to death and asked the mayor of Brettheim, Gackstatter, and the teacher Wolfmeyer to confirm the sentence. The two men refused and were subsequently also arrested and sentenced to death. The men were executed by hanging and strung up on a tree at the entrance of the local cemetery. Simon had ordered that the bodies be left hanging for four days. On 17 April 1945 American tanks approached the village. The SS had declared Brettheim a "cornerstone of the German defense" and prevented the hoisting of white flags. The Americans opened fire, and within a short time the village became a burning inferno. 17 civilians were killed. 

On 1 May 1945 the Corps surrendered to the American forces.

War crimes conviction

After the war, Max Simon was sentenced to death by a British court for his part in the  Marzabotto massacre. This sentence was later changed to life imprisonment. Simon was released from prison in 1954.

Simon was subsequently tried three times by West German courts for the killings in Brettheim and other crimes, but, "to the horror of the West German public," was found not guilty. Simon died in 1961. Even in death, Simon caused some controversy, as HIAG, an organization of former Waffen-SS members, attempted to place a glorifying obituary for him in the German newspaper Frankfurter Allgemeine. To HIAG's indignation, the newspaper refused to run the obituary.

Awards

Clasp to the Iron Cross (1939) 2nd Class (13 September 1939) & 1st class (2 October 1939)
Knight's Cross of the Iron Cross with Oak Leaves
Knight's Cross on 20 October 1941 as SS-Oberführer and commander of SS-Totenkopf-Infanterie-Regiment 1
Oak Leaves on 28 October 1944 as SS-Gruppenführer and Generalleutnant of the Waffen-SS and commander of 16. SS-Panzergrenadier-Division "Reichsführer-SS"
German Cross in Gold on 9 October 1944 as SS-Gruppenführer and Generalleutnant of the Waffen-SS in the 16. SS-Panzergrenadier-Division "Reichsführer-SS"

References
Citations

Bibliography

External links

1899 births
1961 deaths
Military personnel from Wrocław
People from the Province of Silesia
Recipients of the Knight's Cross of the Iron Cross with Oak Leaves
Recipients of the Gold German Cross
Recipients of the Order of Military Merit (Bulgaria)
Officer's Crosses of the Order of Merit of the Republic of Hungary (military)
Recipients of the clasp to the Iron Cross, 2nd class
SS-Gruppenführer
German mass murderers
German prisoners sentenced to death
Prisoners sentenced to death by the British military
German Army personnel of World War I
Prussian Army personnel
20th-century Freikorps personnel
Waffen-SS personnel
Germans convicted of war crimes committed in Italy during World War II